The Portrait of a Musician is an unfinished painting widely attributed to the Italian Renaissance artist Leonardo da Vinci, dated to . Produced while Leonardo was in Milan, the work is painted in oils, and perhaps tempera, on a small panel of walnut wood. It is his only known male portrait painting, and the identity of its sitter has been closely debated among scholars.

Perhaps influenced by Antonello da Messina's introduction of the Early Netherlandish style of portrait painting to Italy, the work marks a dramatic shift from the profile portraiture that predominated in 15th-century Milan. It shares many similarities with other paintings Leonardo executed there, such as the Louvre Virgin of the Rocks and the Lady with an Ermine, but the Portrait of a Musician is his only panel painting remaining in the city, where it has been in the Pinacoteca Ambrosiana since at least 1672. One of Leonardo's best preserved paintings, there are no extant contemporary records of the commission. Based on stylistic resemblances to other works by Leonardo, virtually all current scholarship attributes at least the sitter's face to him. Uncertainty over the rest of the painting arises from the stiff and rigid qualities of the body, which are uncharacteristic of Leonardo's work. While this may be explained by the painting's unfinished state, some scholars believe that Leonardo was assisted by one of his students.

The portrait's intimacy indicates a private commission, or one by a personal friend. Until the 20th century it was thought to show Ludovico Sforza, a Duke of Milan and employer of Leonardo. During a 1904–1905 restoration, the removal of overpainting revealed a hand holding sheet music, indicating that the sitter was a musician. Many musicians active in Milan have been proposed as the sitter; Franchinus Gaffurius was the most favored candidate throughout the 20th century, but in the 21st century scholarly opinion shifted towards Atalante Migliorotti. Other notable suggestions include Josquin des Prez and Gaspar van Weerbeke, but there is no historical evidence to substantiate any of these claims. The work has been criticized for its stoic and wooden qualities, but noted for its intensity and the high level of detail in the subject's face. Scholarly interpretations range from the painting depicting a musician mid-performance, to representing Leonardo's self-proclaimed ideology of the superiority of painting over other art forms, such as music.

Description

Composition

This painting was executed in oils and perhaps tempera on a small,  walnut wood panel. It depicts a young man in bust length and three-quarter view, whose right hand holds a folded piece of sheet music. The painting is largely unfinished save for the face and hair, but is in good condition overall, with only the bottom right corner suffering damage. The art historian Kenneth Clark noted that out of Leonardo's surviving works, the Musician is perhaps the best preserved, despite the fading of colors over time.

The bottom of the work may have been slightly trimmed. There is a small amount of retouching, especially towards the back of the head; the art historian Frank Zöllner has noted that this retouching introduced the somewhat unsuccessful shading of the neck and the left side of the lips. With its black background, the portrait is reminiscent of Leonardo's later portraits, the Lady with an Ermine and La Belle Ferronnière, but differs from them in that the sitter's body and head face the same direction. The biographer Walter Isaacson has noted that due to the work's unfinished state, the portrait's shadows are overtly harsh, and the portrait itself features fewer of the thin layers of oil paint typically found in Leonardo's paintings.

The musician
The sitter has curly shoulder-length hair, wears a red cap, and stares intently at something outside the viewer's field of vision. His stare is intensified by careful lighting that focuses attention on his face, especially on his large glassy eyes. He wears a tight white undershirt. The painting of his black doublet is unfinished and his brownish-orange stole is only underpainted. The colors are faded, probably due to minor repainting and poor conservation. Technical examination of the work has revealed that the doublet was probably originally dark red, and the stole bright yellow.

The mouth hints at a smile, or suggests that the man is about to sing or has just sung. A notable feature of his face is the effect on his eyes from the light outside the frame. The light dilates the pupils of both eyes, but the proper right far more than the left, something that is not possible. Some have argued that this is simply for dramatic effect, so that the viewer feels a sense of motion from the musician's left to right side of his face. The art historian Luke Syson has written that "the eyes are perhaps the most striking feature of the Musician, sight given primacy as the noblest sense and the most important tool of the painter".

Sheet music

The stiffly folded piece of paper, which is held in an odd and delicate manner, is a piece of sheet music with musical notes and letters written on it. Due to the poor condition of the lower part of the painting, the notes and letters are largely illegible. This has not stopped some scholars from hypothesizing what the letters say, often using their interpretations to support their theory of the musician's identity. The partially erased letters can be made out as "Cant" and "An" and are usually read as "", Latin for 'angelic song', although the art historian Martin Kemp notes that it could be "", Italian for 'angelic singer'. The notes have offered little clarity into the painting, other than strongly suggesting that the subject is a musician. They are in mensural notation and therefore probably show polyphonic music. Leonardo's surviving drawings of rebuses with musical notation in the Print Room of Windsor Castle do not resemble the music in the painting. This suggests that this musical composition is not by Leonardo, which leaves the composer and the significance of the music unknown.

Attribution

Although the attribution to Leonardo had been controversial in earlier centuries, modern art historians now regard the Portrait of a Musician as one of his original works. Doubts about ascribing the work to Leonardo have existed for almost as long as the painting has been known. Its first appearance in a 1672 catalog for the Pinacoteca Ambrosiana listed it as by Leonardo, but a 1686 inventory of the collection attributed it to Bernardino Luini. This was quickly crossed out and changed to "or rather by Leonardo". In 1798, the Ambrosiana attributed the portrait to the "school of Luini", but it was soon relisted as by Leonardo. When first listed in 1672, it was described as having "all the elegance that might be expected of a ducal commission", which implies that the subject was thought to be Ludovico Sforza, Duke of Milan, who was Leonardo's employer when the painting was executed. This was accepted until the 20th century, when scholars believed it to be a pendant to the Portrait of a Lady in the Ambrosiana, now attributed to Giovanni Ambrogio de Predis but at the time thought to be a portrait by Leonardo of Beatrice d'Este, Ludovico's wife. In the mid-20th century, the Leonardo specialist Angela Ottino della Chiesa identified eleven scholars who supported an attribution to Leonardo; eight who ascribed the work to Ambrogio de Predis; two who were undecided and one who considered it the work of Giovanni Antonio Boltraffio, another of Leonardo's students.

There is no extant record of the portrait's commission. Its attribution to Leonardo is based on stylistic and technical similarities to other works by him, notably the face of the angel in the Louvre Virgin of the Rocks and that of the titular figure in Saint Jerome in the Wilderness. The dark background of the portrait, a style popularized by Leonardo, furthers this attribution as it appears in later paintings by him, such as the Lady with an Ermine, La Belle Ferronnière and Saint John the Baptist. The Lady with an Ermine in particular has shown many stylistic similarities to the Musician from X-ray testing. Other characteristics typical of Leonardo's style include the melancholic atmosphere, the sensitive eyes, the ambiguous mouth (which seems to have just closed or is about to open), and curly hair reminiscent of his earlier portrait, Ginevra de' Benci. Also characteristic of Leonardo is the use of walnut wood, a medium he favored and recommended, but which was not commonly used by other artists in Lombardy at the time. The attribution is further supported by a comparison of the pupils of the musician's eyes, which dilate to different degrees; a connection has been noted to the following passage in Leonardo's notebooks:

Challenge to the painting's attribution stems from its rigid and stoic demeanor, which is uncharacteristic of Leonardo's usual paintings. While some scholars consider this a result of the painting's unfinished state, others have proposed that the clothing and torso were painted by a student. If Leonardo was assisted by another artist, the most frequently cited candidates are Boltraffio and Ambrogio de Predis, due to their style being closer to the hard and rigid qualities of the portrait. According to the art historian Carlo Pedretti, Boltraffio and Marco d'Oggiono, another student of Leonardo, depict eyes in the same way as the portrait, suggesting that either might have collaborated with Leonardo on the work. The art historian Pietro C. Marani noted that it is unlikely that Leonardo would have had assistants in the mid-1480s, and even if so, they would not likely have assisted on a portrait for an official or a personal friend. Despite Marani's claims, the modern scholarly consensus on whether Leonardo was assisted remains unclear: Zöllner stated that it is "now accepted that Leonardo executed the face, while Boltraffio is credited with the entire upper body", whereas according to Syson only a "substantial minority" of scholars disagreed with a full attribution. While there is debate on the authorship of the painting as a whole, most scholars are agreed that the face, at least, is entirely Leonardo's work.

Dating
Art historians place the work within Leonardo's first Milanese period, due to similarities with other works from this time, including stylistic resemblances to the Lady with an Ermine found via X-ray testing, as well as the treatment of chiaroscuro in the Louvre Virgin of the Rocks, and his sketches for a bronze horse sculpture. Older sources dated the work to the middle of this period, with dates of 1485–1490 and 1490 given.

Modern scholars, including Syson and Marani, have observed that Leonardo could not have executed the portrait much later than 1487, as it is considered to lack the refinement and realism of later works informed by his anatomical studies, such as the Lady with an Ermine. It was not until 1489 that Leonardo engaged in a study of human anatomy, particularly that of the skull. Because of this, the painting is now thought to have been completed earlier in the period, during the mid-1480s, usually between 1483 and 1487.

Background

Historical context
The Portrait of a Musician is a radical departure from the prevailing form of portraiture in 15th-century Milan. The Milanese audience was more artistically conservative than others elsewhere in Italy, and would have expected most, if not all, portraits to be in profile, like those by Zanetto Bugatto, Vincenzo Foppa and Ambrogio Bergognone. The sitter's three-quarter profile was already common in Early Netherlandish painting, where portraits were often set against a flat black background. Antonello da Messina would introduce similar three-quarter-view portraits with black backgrounds in Venice and Sicily, with works like the Portrait of a Man and the Portrait of a Man with a Red Hat. Leonardo is likely to have been influenced by Antonello's style, and could have seen that artist's work during Antonello's brief visit to Milan in 1476, or in Venice around 1486, when Leonardo might have been in the city visiting his former teacher Andrea del Verrocchio. The art historian Daniel Arasse suggested that while the Portrait of a Musician is the most similar of Leonardo's portraits to Antonello's, the figure is facing away from the viewer, in contrast not only to most of Antonello's portraits, but also to Leonardo's other portraits. The Portrait of a Young Man in the Pinacoteca di Brera by an artist in Leonardo's circle was heavily influenced by the Portrait of a Musician.

Provenance

The Portrait of a Musician is Leonardo's only known male portrait painting and his only panel painting to remain in Milan. Marani noted that the work was likely meant for private use. It is generally thought not to have been among the works gifted to the Ambrosiana by its founder, Cardinal Federico Borromeo, in 1618, which at the time made up the bulk of the museum's collection.

The work is first documented in 1672 when it was catalogued by Pietro Paolo Bosca in the Ambrosiana. Sources vary on whether Napoleon took the Portrait of a Musician to France in 1796. Marani stated that it was looted, but Syson stated that the French considered the Codex Atlanticus to be more valuable and took that instead. Both scholars agree that it was in the Ambrosiana in 1798.

The portrait was exhibited in the 2011–2012 exhibition Leonardo da Vinci: Painter at the Court of Milan at the National Gallery, London, the 2015 exhibition Leonardo 1452–1519: Il Disegno del Mondo at the Royal Palace of Milan, and the 2019–2020 exhibition Léonard de Vinci at the Louvre.

Identity of the sitter

The identification of the sitter as Ludovico was accepted until a 1904–1905 restoration by Luigi Cavenaghi and Antonio Grandi removed a layer of overpaint and revealed a hand holding sheet music. This led scholars to believe that the subject was not Ludovico, but a musician in Milan at the same time as Leonardo. Since this discovery, numerous candidates have been proposed as the sitter; however, his identity remains uncertain. The man may have appeared in other works by Leonardo and his studio. Scholars at the National Gallery have suggested that Francesco Napoletano's Portrait of a Youth in Profile and Leonardo's drawing of a Bust of a Youth in Profile are of the same person. Various historical candidates have been proposed, but without firm evidence.

Franchinus Gaffurius
The architectural historian Luca Beltrami's proposition of Franchinus Gaffurius (1451–1522) became the leading candidate in the early 20th century. He is sure to have been acquainted with Leonardo, since—in addition to their shared employer—Gaffurius's 1496 music treatise, contains various woodcuts by Leonardo.

Doubt has been cast upon this theory since the iconographic evidence does not match Gaffurius to the sitter. The subject of the painting was not depicted in a clerical robe, which would have properly identified him as a priest, and the subject of the painting is a young man, whereas Gaffurius would have been in his early thirties at the time of the painting's creation.

Atalante Migliorotti

Marani's 1999 treatise suggests the Tuscan musician Atalante Migliorotti (1466–1532), and since then many commentators have supported the theory. In 1482, Migliorotti and Leonardo left Florence for the court of Ludovico Sforza in Milan. They were known to be friends and Leonardo is believed to have taught Migliorotti the lute. During the painting's conception, Migliorotti would have been in his late teens or early twenties, making him a plausible candidate. Additionally, in a 1482 inventory from the Codex Atlanticus, Leonardo listed "a portrait of Atalante with his face raised". This is thought to have been a study for, or an earlier version of, the Portrait of a Musician. The intimate nature of the present portrait makes it especially likely that the subject was a personal friend.

The main argument against this theory is that the subject's face is not raised as described in the 1482 note. However, Marani noted that while the musician's face is not raised in a literal sense, "the expression seems uplifted, suggesting a singer who has just raised his face from the sheet of music". Since the widespread rejection of Franchinus Gaffurius as the leading candidate, Migliorotti is now favored by many commentators.

Josquin des Prez

In 1972 the Belgian musicologist  proposed the French singer and composer Josquin des Prez ( – 1521) as the sitter. Josquin worked in the service of the Sforza family during the 1480s, concurrently with Leonardo. Clercx-Lejeune proposed that the words on the sheet music are "Cont" (an abbreviation of "Contratenor"), "Cantuz" (Cantus), and "A Z" (an abbreviation of "Altuz"), and that this meant that they were associated with a song with a descending melodic line, such as masses, motets and songs by Josquin. This theory has since been discredited; the notation is largely illegible and many composers were writing in this manner. As with Gaffurius, other portraits of Josquin do not show a resemblance to the sitter and, as a priest in his mid-thirties, he was unlikely to have been the painting's subject.

Gaspar van Weerbeke
The art historian Laure Fagnart suggested in 2019 that the sitter is Gaspar van Weerbeke, a Netherlandish composer and singer. Weerbeke worked for the Sforza family at the same time as Leonardo, and so they likely knew each other. This theory cites letters from Galeazzo Maria Sforza to Gotardo Panigarola concerning the attire of musicians for the court, with one stating, "Gotardo. To Weerbeke, our singer, we would like to give a dark velvet robe, such as you have given to the Abbot [Antonio Guinati] and to Cordier, both of them also our singers". As Fagnart pointed out, the letter is too vaguely stated to definitely link Weerbeke to the portrait. Additionally, Weerbeke presents the same issue as Josquin and Gaffurius; Weerbeke would have been in his thirties and probably too old to be the sitter.

Others
In support of this thesis, the Italian scholar Piero Misciatelli recalls that Galeazzo had been a patron of Leonardo and was probably passionate about music. Other scholars, such as the French art historian Robert de la Sizèranne, have recognized the traits of his father, Roberto Sanseverino.

Gian Galeazzo Sforza (1469–1494) has been proposed, given that the original, vague, description of the portrait stated that it depicted the Duke of Milan. Syson has noted that this identification would be particularly meaningful, as Gian Galeazzo was the rightful heir to the throne before Ludovico took power. However, there is no direct evidence to support this, and the uncovering of the sheet music makes this very unlikely as Gian Galeazzo is not known to have been a musician.

Francesco Canova da Milano (1497–1543), an Italian lutenist and composer, and the Flemish singer Giovanni Cordier have been proposed, albeit without substantive evidence.  The Dutch illustrator Siegfried Woldhek has suggested that the Portrait of a Musician is one of three self-portraits by Leonardo.

Critical opinion
The critical opinion of the Portrait of a Musician has historically been mixed, and negative reactions have given some scholars reluctance to grant it a full attribution to Leonardo. The 19th-century art historian Eugène Müntz complemented its "vigor of modeling worthy of Rembrandt", but criticized the work for a sullen expression, poor coloring and incompleteness. According to Marani, these comments can largely be explained by Müntz's use of a very poor reproduction for analysis. Like Müntz, Zöllner found fault with the work's incompleteness and expression; he also considered its pose inferior to that of Ginevra de' Benci. The art historian Jack Wasserman has stated that the portrait lacks the typical facial intensity of Leonardo's other works; however, Syson and Kemp have praised the sitter's intense stare, and the art historian Alessandro Vezzosi stated that in this work "Leonardo attains an unprecedented level of psychological intensity, which reaches the sublime in Lady with an Ermine". The chiaroscuro has been a point of contention: Zöllner and other scholars have criticized it as "over-emphatic"; Syson considered it dramatic and compelling; whereas Isaacson has criticized the shadowing but praised the lighting of the eyes. Syson has suggested that the work's unfinished state largely accounts for these negative reactions.

Interpretation
Due to a paucity of contemporary records, some scholars have proposed theories as to the purpose of the painting. Some believe that the tension in the subject's face is intense because he has just finished or is in the process of performing. Other scholars see the painting as a representation of Leonardo's self-proclaimed ideology of the superiority of painting over other art forms such as poetry, sculpture and music. Leonardo declared at the beginning of his incomplete Treatise on Painting:

These words seemingly disapprove of music's ephemeral nature, in contrast to painting's material and permanent physical qualities. This theory suggests that the sadness in the young man's eyes is due to the idea that music simply disappears after a performance. Another interpretation is that Leonardo was moved to depict the man's beauty. More likely, given the odd and seemingly intimate aesthetic of the painting, is that it was made as a personal gift for a close friend.

References

Notes

Citations

Sources
Books

 
 
 
 
 
 
 
 
 
 
 
 
 
 
 
 
 
 
 
 

Journal and encyclopedia articles

Further reading

External links

 Portrait of a Musician, Pinacoteca Ambrosiana
 Portrait of a Musician, Universal Leonardo

Paintings by Leonardo da Vinci
Paintings in the collection of the Pinacoteca Ambrosiana
1480 paintings
1490 paintings
15th-century portraits
Portraits of men
Cultural depictions of musicians
Unfinished paintings